Jeffrey Collé is a real estate developer who specializes in luxury estates in the Hamptons — a collection of hamlets and villages located at the East End of Long Island, New York. The area traditionally features some of the most expensive and luxurious residential properties in the United States. Collé, with his former business partner, Howard Gittis, started a speculative real estate development business in the Hamptons. Collé has experience as both a carpenter and a designer-builder, and has created homes for celebrities and prominent individuals.

Early life 
Jeffrey Collé was born in 1952 in Long Island, New York. Collé's grandfather (who immigrated to the U.S. from Belgium in 1913) and his father were both carpenters. Starting early in life, he worked for his grandfather and father on various construction sites in Long Island and New York City.

Education 
Collé attended a vocational school as an apprentice carpenter in his late teens. He also worked with craftsmen across various trades, and became proficient in several disciplines, including tile work, cabinetry, painting, electrical and plumbing. In 1970, at age 18, Collé joined the United Brotherhood of Carpenters and Joiners of America, where he became a Journeyman Carpenter after attending a four-year apprenticeship program.

Design-Builder Career 
At 24, Collé began his career as a professional builder and started his own business, which is now called Estates by Jeffrey Collé. His first luxury residential home project was located in Hampton Bays, New York, and he has built his career on being a builder, developer, and investor of luxury homes in the Hamptons.

Partnership 
In 1995, Jeffrey Collé was discovered by Howard Gittis, an attorney, investor, and longtime adviser to Ronald Perelman and Philadelphia Mayor Frank Rizzo. Gittis and Collé started the first multimillion-dollar speculative real estate development business in the Hamptons, and completed many luxury real estate development projects together over a 12-year period until the death of Gittis on September 17, 2007.

Consulting & Real Estate Development 
Collé has continued to expand his work as a real estate developer, design-builder, investor, and consultant of luxury real estate projects. In addition to designing and building luxury homes, Collé has advised celebrities such as Donna Karan and Billy Joel, real estate brokers, investors, and others on various topics related to luxury real estate development and homebuilding.

References 

1952 births
Living people